This is a list of seasons played by ZFK CSKA Moscow, the women's football section of Russian sports club CSKA Moscow.

Summary

References

ZFK
ZFK
CSKA
CSKA